The Shenyang Zhongyi Mitakon Speedmaster 50 mm f/0.95 lens is a standard manual focus prime lens for Sony E-mount, announced by Shenyang Zhongyi Mitakon on May 6, 2014.

Though designed for Sony's full frame E-mount cameras, the lens can be used on Sony's APS-C E-mount camera bodies, with an equivalent full-frame field-of-view of 75mm.

Optical properties
The lens features an exceptionally fast maximum aperture of f/0.95, lending itself to creamy smooth bokeh and a narrow depth of view.

See also
 List of third-party E-mount lenses

References

Camera lenses introduced in 2014
E-mount lenses